Kortemark, also previously Cortemarck, is a municipality located in the Belgian province of West Flanders. The municipality comprises the towns of Handzame, Kortemark, Werken and Zarren. On January 1, 2006, Kortemark had a total population of 11,976. The total area is 55.00 km² which gives a population density of 218 inhabitants per km².

Notable people
 Gustave Sap, politician, (Kortemark, 21 January 1886 - Brussels, 19 March 1940)

References

External links 

Municipalities of West Flanders